Rough Ridin' Justice is a 1945 American Western film directed by Derwin Abrahams and written by Elizabeth Beecher. The film stars Charles Starrett, Dub Taylor, Betty Jane Graham and Jimmy Wakely. The film was released on March 14, 1945, by Columbia Pictures.

Plot

Cast          
Charles Starrett as Steve Holden
Dub Taylor as Cannonball
Betty Jane Graham as Gail Trent
Jimmy Wakely as Jimmy Wakely
Wheeler Oakman as Virgil Trent
Jack Ingram as Nick Dunham
Forrest Taylor as Sidney Padgett
Jack Rockwell as Sheriff Kramer
Edmund Cobb as Harris
Dan White as Mike
Bob Kortman as Pete
George Chesebro as Lacey
Robert Ross as Bob
Steve Clark as Gray

References

External links
 

1945 films
American Western (genre) films
1945 Western (genre) films
Columbia Pictures films
Films directed by Derwin Abrahams
American black-and-white films
1940s English-language films
1940s American films